The twentieth season of Saturday Night Live, an American sketch comedy series, originally aired in the United States on NBC between September 24, 1994, and May 13, 1995.

Much like the 1980–1981 season and the 1985–1986 season, NBC worried over SNLs decline in quality (and in the ratings) and initially decided that now would be the best time to pull the plug on the show once and for all. According to the prime time special Saturday Night Live in the '90s: Pop Culture Nation, Lorne Michaels credits this season as the closest he's ever been to being fired. In the end, the cast member firings and crew turnover resulting from this season represented the biggest involvement into the show's affairs by NBC executives since the 1980–1981 season and the biggest cast overhaul since the 1985–1986 season.

This season saw the deaths of two SNL alumni: season 11 cast member Danitra Vance (who died of breast cancer) and "Not Ready for Primetime"-era writer and occasional performer Michael O'Donoghue (who died of a brain hemorrhage after years of suffering from migraine headaches). The Sarah Jessica Parker-hosted episode featured a special appearance by Bill Murray, who introduced a clip from season3, "The Soiled Kimono", aired in O'Donoghue's memory.

Cast
Preceding the season 20 premiere, Phil Hartman, Melanie Hutsell, Rob Schneider, Sarah Silverman and Julia Sweeney had all left the show. In their places, the show hired Chris Elliott, Janeane Garofalo and Laura Kightlinger to the cast. Elliott and Garofalo were made repertory players, while Kightlinger was made a featured player.

Jay Mohr remained a featured player and Norm Macdonald was promoted to repertory status and made Weekend Updates latest anchor. (Though Kevin Nealon was no longer a Weekend Update anchor, he still remained on the show.)

As the season progressed, Morwenna Banks, Mark McKinney and Molly Shannon were added to the cast. (McKinney was hired from the then-recently ended sketch show The Kids in the Hall, which was produced by Michaels.)

Several cast members quit the show mid-season. Mike Myers left after the January 21, 1995 episode (exactly six years after his first episode on January 21, 1989), largely due to his increasing fame as a film star (notably with his role in 1992's Wayne's World). Janeane Garofalo quit the show following the February 25 episode, citing her unhappiness with the work environment and writing material. She would later call Saturday Night Live "...an unfair boys' club" and call many of the sketches "juvenile and homophobic." Al Franken's final appearance as a featured player was on May6 following the box office failure of the SNL spin-off film Stuart Saves His Family.

Following the May 13, 1995 season finale, nine more cast members either quit or were fired from Saturday Night Live, including Banks, Cleghorne, Elliott, Farley, Kightlinger, McKean, Mohr, Nealon and Sandler. In his book, Gasping for Airtime, Mohr wrote that following the season, he demanded a promotion to repertory status, among other things; the network procrastinated his wishes throughout the summer of 1995, and he chose to quit the show.  Mohr's account of his voluntary departure from SNL has been widely discounted, however. He was under a cloud of suspicion due to his admitted plagiarizing of jokes during the season, and his multi-year contract with NBC did not allow him to unilaterally quit.

This is the final season for cast members Kevin Nealon, Mike Myers, Al Franken, Chris Farley, Adam Sandler, Ellen Cleghorne, Jay Mohr and Michael McKean and the only season for Janeane Garofalo, Chris Elliot, Morwenna Banks, and Laura Kightlinger. Myers, Garofalo, and Franken all left the show mid-season, and Nealon, Cleghorne, McKean, Elliott, and Kightlinger all left the show at season's end on their own terms. Farley, Sandler, Mohr, and Banks were let go from the show at the end of the season.

This was also the final season for director Dave Wilson and bandleader G.E. Smith, who had been with the program since its first and eleventh seasons, respectively.

Cast rosterRepertory playersMorwenna Banks (first episode: April 8, 1995)
Ellen Cleghorne
Chris Elliott
Chris Farley
Janeane Garofalo (final episode: February 25, 1995)Norm MacdonaldMichael McKean
Mark McKinney (first episode: January 14, 1995)
Tim Meadows
Mike Myers (final episode: January 21, 1995)
Kevin Nealon
Adam Sandler
David SpadeFeatured players'''
Al Franken (final episode: May 6, 1995)
Laura Kightlinger
Jay Mohr
Molly Shannon (first episode: February 25, 1995)

bold denotes Weekend Update anchor

Writers

Notable writers during the 20th season of Saturday Night Live included Jim Downey, Al Franken, Tim Herlihy and Robert Smigel.

Episodes

Stuart Saves His Family filmStuart Saves His Family, a film based on the popular Stuart Smalley sketches, was released on April 12, 1995. Cast members Robin Duke, Al Franken and Julia Sweeney appear in the film. The film received modest reviews from critics but was a box office bomb. During the season, Franken performed a Stuart Smalley sketch that parodied the film's poor box office returns. Stuart was depressed and bitter throughout the entire segment, eating cookies and lambasting the audience for choosing other movies (such as Dumb and Dumber'' and anything Pauly Shore had out at the time) over his.

References

20
Saturday Night Live in the 1990s
1994 American television seasons
1995 American television seasons